The Bolivarian Agency for Space Activities (Agencia Bolivariana para Actividades Espaciales, ABAE) is an agency of the Ministry of Science of Venezuela, responsible for developing and carrying out policies of the National Executive Venezuela regarding the use of the outer space.

History

Originally designated Venezuelan Space Center (CEV), created on November 28, 2005. Then, the requirements grew up and the body was renamed as Bolivarian Agency for Space Activities (ABAE). The purpose of this agency is to design, coordinate and implement and operate the policies of the Venezuelan National Executive, related to the peaceful use of outer space, and act as a decentralized entity specialized in aerospace. Since its creation, it has been working on the launch of the first artificial satellite of Venezuela, the Satellite Simon Bolivar (Venesat-1), operational on October 29, 2008, Satellite Miranda (VRSS-1) on September 29, 2012, Satellite Sucre (VRSS-2) Oct 2017, operates the Ground Receiving Stations and Ground Application Center for the country's remote sensing satellites.

Objectives

Among the objectives of the Bolivarian Agency for Space Activities, some include:

 Proposing to Venezuelan National Executive, space policies in the short term.
 Run the space policy defined by the National Executive.
 Develop and implement activities and programs in the space field.
 Ensure compliance of international treaties governing space issues.
 Establish technical criteria for harmonizing the various national initiatives in the field of space technology.
 Promote solidarity and cooperation among the National Government institutions.
 Others as defined by their body attachment.

Research lines and specific interests 

Among the research and interests of the Bolivarian Agency for Space Activities, some include:

Telecommunications 
 Technological Appropriation Program of VENESAT-1
 Training of Venezuelan operators and engineers in overlooking the administration of satellite ground control port.
 Transmission of telecommunication signals from fixed service between earth stations. The flow includes areas of telephony, fax, radio programs, television and the Internet .
 Applications in maritime, aeronautical and land mobile services satellite intercom from SMS mobile networks.
 Direct Broadcast Services video, audio and other data to the general public from the space platform.

Earth Observation 
 Operate and Distribute the image data from the Venezuelan Remote Sensing Satellite constellation.
 Generation of Thematic Maps, Data and value added material for Remote Sensing Applications.
 Global Navigation Research & Applications.
 Earth Resources research (Mining, Oil & Geomorphology ).

Space Engineering 
 Research and Develop capabilities for Spacecraft's Design, Assembly Integration and Test. 
 Mission & Satellite System Design, Mechanism & Structure, On Board Data Handling, Attitude & Orbit Control System, Telemetry/Telecommand and Ranging, Power Supply, Payload Data Transmission, Thermal Control
 Assembly & Integration Process Design, Thermal Test Operation, Acoustic Test, Dynamic Test, Fuel Pipe's Leackage Test, Electrical Test
 Satellite Control Center Operation.

Governance 
The institution is governed and administered by a board of directors composed of a chairman and four members and their alternates. The President is appointed by the head of state, the four members and their alternates shall be officials of appointment and removal of the Minister of Science (MPPEUCT)

See also
 List of government space agencies
 Venesat-1
 VRSS-1
 VRSS-2
 Communications satellite

References

Member Of 
International Charter 'Space and Major Disasters'

External links
 Satellite Miranda (Spanish)
 Official website
 Ministry of Popular Power for Science, Technology and Intermediate Industries of Venezuela

Space agencies
Organizations based in Venezuela
Organizations established in 2005
2005 establishments in Venezuela
Space program of Venezuela